The Theater Television Network was an early American television network founded in 1951. The network was not a traditional 1950s television network: unlike the other TV networks that operated at that time, Theater Network programs were not broadcast into homes; instead, they aired at participating movie theaters.

The Theater Television Network, like many current theaters do for major events, broadcast mostly sporting events: NCAA basketball games, boxing matches, entertainment events. TTN however also broadcast public affairs programming. The network broadcast Harry Truman's 1951 State of the Union address.

Theater Television required special equipment to be installed at the Theater. After this initial cost the content could be transmitted over the air or through telephone cables. There were drawbacks to both systems. Theater owners pressed the FCC for bandwidth in the UHF spectrum but this was either resisted or given in short-term periods. The alternative was to use AT&T cable which was both expensive and limited the quality of the output.

In the period 1948-52 the FCC imposed a ban on issuing licences for new TV stations. This was the window of opportunity for Theater Television. However, once the freeze was over many new TV stations were established and the public preferred "free" TV in their own living rooms. The last Theater Television operation finished in 1953.

References

Defunct television networks in the United States
Television channels and stations established in 1951
1953 disestablishments in the United States
Television channels and stations disestablished in 1953
1951 establishments in the United States